Shahid Uddin Ahmed Selim ( 1952 – 5 January 2022) was a Bangladeshi footballer who played as a centre-back. He spent the majority of his career with Brothers Union and was also an integral member of the Bangladesh national team during the late 1970s and early 1980s. Selim captained Bangladesh during the 1980 AFC Asian Cup, which was the country's first ever appearance in a major tournament and also the only time they qualified for the AFC Asian Cup to date.

Club career
During the Liberation war in 1971, Brothers Union shut down the club's activities, after the war ended, Selim started reorganizing the players in 1972, and also managed to attain the services of Pakistani coach Abdul Gafur Baloch. During the early years of the club's rebirth, the players used to train in Selim's older brother Manik's four-storey building in 48 Ramakrishna Mission Road, Gopibagh, due to the team's financial difficulties. This is why he is seen as one of the founding members of Brothers Union, even though the club was established in 1949. Selim spent ten years captaining "The Oranges" during which Brothers became the third best club in the country behind Abahani Krira Chakra and Mohammedan SC. In 1973, Brothers won the third division, and in 1974, Selim captained Brothers to another promotion by winning the second-tier. In 1975 his Brothers Union team took part in the country's top-tier the Dhaka League for the first time, and surprised the whole country when they defeated giants Abahani Limited Dhaka during their first league encounter. Selim remained Brothers captain until 1978. In 1980, Selim was part of the team which won the Federation Cup alongside Mohammedan SC. The following year he won the Aga Khan Gold Cup with Brothers, alongside Thai club Bangkok Bank FC.

International career
In 1975, Selim made his international debut, when Bangladesh decided to participate at the Merdeka Cup, in Malaysia. This was only the second time that Bangladesh took part in an international tournament, and the national team coach at the time Abdur Rahim included Selim in the team as the main center-back Monwar Hossain Nannu was injured. He captained the Bangladesh U20 team during the 1977 AFC Youth Championship.

In 1978, when several players quit the national team after a captaincly dispute involving Mohammedan's Shaidhur Rahman Shantoo and Abahani's Nannu, the federation decided to refrain from selecting captains from the two Dhaka teams, Selim was named the national team captain, in 1980. He captained the Bangladesh team during the 1980 AFC Asian Cup, in Kuwait.

Managerial career
Selim got his coaching license in 1990 in Bangalore, India. He managed the Bangladesh national football team during the 1991 South Asian Games and helped the country earn third place, by defeating Nepal 2–0. During the same tournament, Selim became the first national team coach to defeat arch-rivals India, thanks to a brace from striker Rizvi Karim Rumi. In 1991, Selim won the Federation Cup with Brothers Union. From 1994 to 2009 he was the joint secretary of the Brothers Union. Selim was the vice president of the Gopibagh-based club from 2010 until his death in 2022.

Personal life and death
Bangladeshi communist politician, the late Saifuddin Ahmed Manik, was Selim's older brother and one of the founding members of Brothers Union.

He died from oral cancer on 5 January 2022, at the age of 69.

Honours

Player
Brothers Union
 Dhaka Third Division Football League = 1973
 Dhaka Second Division Football League = 1974
 Federation Cup = 1980
 Aga Khan Gold Cup = 1981

Manager
Brothers Union
 Federation Cup : 1991

Bangladesh
 South Asian Games Bronze medal: 1991

References

1950s births
2022 deaths
Bangladeshi footballers
Association football central defenders
Bangladesh international footballers
Bangladesh national football team managers
Brothers Union players
1980 AFC Asian Cup players
Footballers from Dhaka
Deaths from cancer in Bangladesh
Deaths from oral cancer